Enteucha acuta is a moth of the family Nepticulidae. It is only known from the lowland Amazon rainforest in Ecuador.

The wingspan is 3.4–3.5 mm for males. It is known from a single adult collected in January 2001.

External links
New Neotropical Nepticulidae (Lepidoptera) from the western Amazonian rainforest and the Andes of Ecuador

Nepticulidae
Moths of South America
Moths described in 2002